The thirteenth season of the American police procedural drama NCIS premiered on September 22, 2015, in the same time slot as in the previous seasons, Tuesdays at 8 pm.

NCIS revolves around a fictional team of special agents from the Naval Criminal Investigative Service, which conducts criminal investigations involving the U.S. Navy and Marine Corps. The series was renewed for a thirteenth season by CBS on Monday, May 11, 2015. Michael Weatherly, who stars as Anthony DiNozzo on the show, departed the series in the season finale. On February 29, 2016, NCIS was renewed for seasons fourteen and fifteen.

Production 
The series was renewed for a thirteenth season by CBS on Monday, May 11, 2015. Production on this season started in late July. On January 5, 2016, CBS announced Weatherly's departure from the series after thirteen seasons. Scottie Thompson returned as Jeanne Benoit, Tony's ex-girlfriend, in episodes 8 and 16. Scott Bakula, Lucas Black, Zoe McLellan, and Shalita Grant star in a crossover with NCIS: New Orleans, in the episode "Sister City (Part I)", as NCIS Special Agent Dwayne Pride, NCIS Special Agent Christopher LaSalle, NCIS Special Agent Meredith "Merri" Brody, and NCIS Special Agent Sonja Percy, respectively.

Cast

Main 
 Mark Harmon as Leroy Jethro Gibbs, NCIS Supervisory Special Agent (SSA) of the Major Case Response Team (MCRT) assigned to Washington's Navy Yard
 Michael Weatherly as Anthony DiNozzo, NCIS Senior Special Agent, second in command of MCRT
 Pauley Perrette as Abby Sciuto, Forensic Specialist for NCIS
 Sean Murray as Timothy McGee, NCIS Special Agent
 Brian Dietzen as Jimmy Palmer, Assistant Medical Examiner for NCIS
 Emily Wickersham as Eleanor "Ellie" Bishop, NCIS Special Agent
 Rocky Carroll as Leon Vance, NCIS Director
 David McCallum as Dr. Donald "Ducky" Mallard, Chief Medical Examiner for NCIS

Recurring 
 Alan Dale as Thomas Morrow, Homeland Security Section Chief and former NCIS Director
 Joe Spano as Tobias Fornell, FBI Senior Special Agent
 Richard Riehle as Maynard County Sheriff Walt Osorio and Sherlock Consortium member
 Kent Shocknek as Guy Ross, ZNN news anchor
 Adam Campbell as young Donald Mallard 
 Salli Richardson-Whitfield as Carrie Clark, former FBI Special Agent, turned criminal attorney
 Jessica Walter as Judith McKnight, Sherlock Consortium member
 Todd Louiso as Lyle Waznicki, Sherlock Consortium member
 Joel Gretsch as Stan Burley, NCIS Special Agent and former member of Gibbs' team
 Scottie Thompson as Jeanne Woods, Tony's ex-girlfriend
 David Dayan Fisher as Trent Kort, rogue CIA Agent
 Robert Wagner as Anthony DiNozzo, Sr., Tony's father
 Leslie Hope as Sarah Porter, Secretary of the Navy
 Margo Harshman as Delilah Fielding, DoD Computer Specialist and McGee's girlfriend
 Juliette Angelo as Emily Fornell, Tobias Fornell's daughter
 Kelli Williams as Maureen Cabot, NCIS Special Agent
 Jamie Bamber as Jake Malloy, NSA attorney and Bishop's ex-husband 
 Mimi Rogers as Joanna Teague, CIA Agent and Ned Dorneget's mother
 Sarah Clarke as Tess Monroe, FBI Senior Special Agent
 Duane Henry as Clayton Reeves, MI6 Senior Officer
 Mila Brener as Kelly Gibbs, Gibbs' deceased daughter
 Jon Cryer as Dr. Cyril Taft, surgeon who operates on Gibbs
 Laura San Giacomo as Dr. Grace Confalone, psychotherapist
 Marina Sirtis as Orli Elbaz, Mossad Director

Guest appearances 

 Muse Watson as Mike Franks, deceased retired Senior Special Agent for NCIS and Gibbs' former boss
 Scott Bakula as Dwayne Pride, NCIS Supervisory Special Agent (SSA) in New Orleans
 Lucas Black as Christopher Lasalle, NCIS Senior Field Agent in New Orleans
 Zoe McLellan as Meredith "Merri" Brody, NCIS Special Agent in New Orleans 
 Shalita Grant as Sonja Percy, NCIS Special Agent in New Orleans
 Giles Matthey as Daniel Budd, NCIS target in the international terrorist group 'The Calling'
 Daniel Zolghadri as Luke Harris, recruit to 'The Calling' who shot Gibbs (12.24)
 Tyler Ritter as Luca Sciuto, Abby's brother
 Cassidy Freeman as Eva Azarova, Russian sleeper agent
 Andy Beckwith as HM Prison Service Custodial Manager Chester Grimm 
 Vince Nappo as Jacob Scott, former prisoner being pursued by Tony along with MI6
 Michelle Obama as herself
 Stephanie Koenig as Lauren Hudson, mistress of Marine Captain Dean Hudson

Episodes

Ratings

References 

General

External links 

 

2015 American television seasons
2016 American television seasons
NCIS 13